Asperoteuthis is a genus of chiroteuthid squid comprising four species:

Asperoteuthis acanthoderma Lu, 1977
Asperoteuthis lui Salcedo-Vargas, 1999
Asperoteuthis mangoldae Young, Vecchione & Roper, 2007
Asperoteuthis nesisi Arkhipkin & Laptikhovsky, 2008

References

Lu, C.C. 1977. A new species of squid, Chiroteuthis acanthoderma, from the Southwestern Pacific (Cephalopoda, Chirothidae). Steenstrupia Zoological Museum University of Copenhagen 4(16): 179–188.
Young, R.E., M. Vecchione & C.F.E. Roper 2007. A new genus and three new species of decapodiform cephalopods (Mollusca: Cephalopoda). Reviews in Fish Biology and Fisheries 17(2–3): 353–365.

External links

Tree of Life web project: Asperoteuthis

Squid
Cephalopod genera